Andreas Siegfried Sachs (7 April 1930 – 23 November 2016), known professionally as Andrew Sachs, was a German-born British actor and writer. He made his name on British television and found his greatest fame for his portrayal of the comical Spanish waiter Manuel in Fawlty Towers.

Sachs had a long career in acting and voice-over work for television, film and radio. He was successful well into his eighties, with roles in numerous films such as Quartet, and as Ramsay Clegg in Coronation Street.

Early life
Sachs was born in Berlin, Germany, the son of Katharina (née Schrott-Fiecht), a librarian, and Hans Emil Sachs, an insurance broker. His father was Jewish and his mother was Lutheran, with Austrian ancestry. The family moved to Britain in 1938 to escape the Nazis. They settled in north London, and he lived in Kilburn for the rest of his life.

In 1960, Sachs married the actress, writer, and fashion designer Melody Lang, who took his surname. He adopted her two sons from a previous marriage, who became known as John Sachs and William Sachs, and the couple had one daughter, Kate Sachs, in 1961. Lang appeared in one episode of Fawlty Towers, "Basil the Rat", as Mrs. Taylor.

Career

Early work
In the late 1950s, whilst still studying shipping management at college, Sachs worked on radio productions, including Private Dreams and Public Nightmares by Frederick Bradnum, an early experimental programme made by the BBC Radiophonic Workshop.

Sachs began in acting with repertory theatre and made his West End debut as Grobchick in the 1958 production of the Whitehall farce Simple Spymen. He made his screen debut in 1959 in the film The Night We Dropped a Clanger. He then appeared in numerous television series throughout the 1960s, including some appearances in ITC productions such as The Saint (1962) and Randall and Hopkirk (Deceased) (1969).

Fawlty Towers
Sachs is best known for portraying Manuel, the Spanish waiter on the iconic sitcom Fawlty Towers (1975 and 1979), a role for which he was nominated for a BAFTA award (the award went to co-star John Cleese). He claimed in 1981 that Manuel was "really a very small part. In fact there was only one episode of Fawlty Towers – the one with the hamster – in which I had anything much to do."

Sachs recorded three singles in character as Manuel; the first was "Manuel's Good Food Guide" in 1977, in which he appeared, in character, on the cover. Sachs was co-author of the tracks. This was followed in 1979 by "O Cheryl" with "Ode to England" on the B side, under the name "Manuel and Los Por Favors". Sachs shares the writing credits for the B side with "B. Wade", who also wrote the A side. In 1981, at the urging of Elton John, "Manuel" released a cover version of Joe Dolce's worldwide hit "Shaddap You Face", with "Waiter, there's a Flea in my Soup" on the B side. When finally released it reached 138 in the UK Chart. Dolce prohibited Sachs from releasing his version until the original had been a hit.

He was the subject of This Is Your Life in 1980, when he was surprised by Eamonn Andrews while making a personal appearance as Manuel at the HMV store on London's Oxford Street.

Sachs, who had himself experienced life as a 'foreigner' in Britain, denied allegations that the character was based on racist stereotypes, arguing that Manuel could have been any 'foreign' worker.

During the shooting of the Fawlty Towers episode "The Germans", Sachs was left with second degree acid burns due to a fire stunt. He was also hit with a faulty prop on the set of the show by Cleese and suffered a severe headache.

Voice work and narration
Sachs was frequently heard as a narrator of television and radio documentaries, including all five series of BBC's BAFTA Award-winning business television series Troubleshooter presented by Sir John Harvey-Jones and ITV's ...from Hell series. He also narrated several audio books, including C. S. Lewis's Narnia series and Alexander McCall Smith's first online book, Corduroy Mansions, as well as two audiobooks of the popular children's TV series Thomas the Tank Engine and Friends "Thomas and the Tiger" and "Thomas and the Dinosaur". He provided the voice of Puzzle the Donkey in the Focus on the Family production of The Last Battle by C. S. Lewis. In 2000, Sachs narrated the spoof documentary series That Peter Kay Thing. He also narrated the documentary series Eyewitness, based on the children's books of the same name.

Sachs performed all the voices in the English-language version of Jan Švankmajer's 1994 film Faust. He also did voices for children's animation, including William's Wish Wellingtons, Starhill Ponies, The Gingerbread Man, Little Grey Rabbit, The Forgotten Toys, Asterix and the Big Fight. and the horse in the English-language version of 1970's cult TV show Monkey.

Roles for radio include G. K. Chesterton's Father Brown, 1984–1986, Dr. John Watson in four series of original Sherlock Holmes stories for BBC Radio 4, Jeeves in The Code of the Woosters, Edmond Dantès in The Count of Monte Cristo on BBC Radio 7's "Young Classics" series, Snowy in The Adventures of Tintin, and Tooley in Neil Gaiman's Neverwhere.

Later work
Although no other role gained him the same attention as Manuel, Sachs continued to star in a range of productions, both comedic and dramatic. In a reversal of his Fawlty Towers role, he was the hotel manager Don Carlos Bernardo in the 1977 Are You Being Served? movie,In addition he also played the recurring character of Barrister Jeremy Nisbett Q.C. in the Granada Television daytime series, Crown Court.

In 1980 Sachs starred in the title role of a four-part BBC adaptation of the H. G. Wells's The History of Mr Polly. The following year, he portrayed a French Revolutionary in Mel Brooks's History of the World, Part I.

In 1990, he appeared as a contestant on Cluedo, facing off against fellow actor Keith Barron.

In 1992, he voiced the titular gingerbread man in the animated series The Gingerbread Man. He also voiced the characters Mr. Salt, Herr Von Cuckoo, and Sleek The Mouse.

In 1994 Sachs appeared in the popular Thames Television comedy drama series Minder. He played Sidney Myers in the episode"All Things Brighton Beautiful".

In 1996, Sachs portrayed Albert Einstein in an episode of the American PBS series NOVA entitled "Einstein Revealed". In 1997, Sachs played opposite Shane Richie in Chris Barfoot's Dead Clean: in a tale of mistaken identity, Sachs plays airport window cleaner Kostas Malmatakis who is hired to assassinate a businessman by his greedy partner (Mark Chapman); the British short won a Gold Remi at the Houston Worldfest in 2001.

Sachs has had several roles in Doctor Who productions. He played "Skagra" in the webcast/audio version of the Doctor Who story Shada, completed by Big Finish Productions and in 2008 he played the elderly version of former companion Adric, in another Doctor Who story for the same company, The Boy That Time Forgot. In the 1980s, Sachs had submitted his name to be considered for the part of the Seventh Doctor in the television series.

In 2005, Sachs served as the performer for the audiobook version of Urchin of the Riding Stars, the first book of The Mistmantle Chronicles. In 2007, the BBC broadcast an adaptation of Dirk Gently's Holistic Detective Agency with Sachs portraying Reg (Professor Urban Chronotis, the Regius Professor of Chronology). He would later appear in another Adams adaptation as the Book in the live tour of The Hitchhiker's Guide to the Galaxy during its run at Bromley's Churchill Theatre.

On 17 November 2008, it was announced that Sachs had been approached to appear in ITV soap Coronation Street. He later confirmed on 14 December that he was taking up the offer, saying "My wife was such a fan that I've been watching it since 1962". In May 2009 he made his debut on the street as Norris' brother, Ramsay. He appeared in 27 episodes and left in August 2009.

Sachs toured with the Australian pianist Victor Sangiorgio in a two-man show called "Life after Fawlty", which included Richard Strauss's voice and piano setting of Alfred, Lord Tennyson's poem "Enoch Arden". 2012 saw his last major role, as Bobby Swanson in the movie Quartet.

Writing
Between 1962 and 1985 Sachs wrote a number of plays for theatre and radio, in parallel with his acting career. His first radio play, in 1962, was One Man and His Dog. Till Death Do Us Join, concerning Ernest Wire's desire to murder his wife, and Ruby Drab's hope to 'dispose of her spouse', was produced by the BBC in 1964 and broadcast in Australia as So You Want to Get Rid of Your Wife the following year. In 1978, BBC Radio 4 broadcast The Revenge, a ground-breaking 30-minute play totally without dialogue (an experiment in binaural stereo recording), written and performed by Sachs. It was dismissed by playwright Jonathan Raban as a "wordless sequence of noises" and "a well-puffed curiosity". The play has however subsequently been repeated a number of times on BBC Radio 4 Extra.Made in Heaven, which had starred Sachs's future Fawlty Towers co-star Prunella Scales when produced for radio in 1971, was brought to the stage in 1975. As performed at the Chichester Festival it starred Patrick Macnee. Though it was a popular success, Sachs said in 1981, "the critics really slaughtered it ... Actually, I had to agree with the critics. There was a lot wrong with the play." He professed his intention to rewrite the work and stage it again.

Sachs claimed he would "concentrate on writing if anything happened to impair my acting. But I'm very much a part-time writer."

Prank phone call controversy

On 25 October 2008, the BBC apologised to Sachs and his agent after they had been informed that Russell Brand and Jonathan Ross had made several obscene phone calls to him during an episode of The Russell Brand Show recorded on 16 October and broadcast two days later, on which Sachs had agreed to appear. Both presenters had left explicit messages on Sachs's telephone answering machine stating that Brand had had sex with his granddaughter, Georgina Baillie.

Gordon Brown, the then Prime Minister, criticised Ross and Brand's actions, saying that it was "clearly inappropriate and unacceptable behaviour", and the television watchdog, Ofcom, launched an inquiry into the matter. Afterwards, Brand and Controller of Radio 2 Lesley Douglas resigned, with Ross soon suspended. In February 2014, Sachs was interviewed by the BBC about his autobiography. He spoke of how the scandal still affected him.

Illness and death
Sachs was diagnosed with vascular dementia in 2012, which eventually left him unable to speak and forced him to use a wheelchair. He died on 23 November 2016 at the Denville Hall nursing home in Northwood, London. His funeral took place on 1 December, the same day his death was publicly announced. Melody Sachs died the following year.

On 2 December 2016, BBC One broadcast the Fawlty Towers episode "Communication Problems" in his memory. John Cleese paid tribute to Sachs, describing him as a "sweet, sweet man".

 Legacy 
In July 2021 the BBC Two television series Secrets of the Museum featured the conservation and installation of the waiter's white outfit, worn by the Manuel character in Fawlty Towers, which had been donated to the Victoria and Albert Museum by his daughter Kate, as part of the museum's permanent costume exhibition.

Selected filmography

Books
2015, I Know Nothing! The Autobiography'', The Robson Press,  (shortlisted for The Sheridan Morley Prize, 2015)

References

External links

Radio Plays by Andrew Sachs
Imperial War Museum Interview
Obituary: Andrew Sachs From BBC News

1930 births
2016 deaths
20th-century British male actors
21st-century British male actors
Audiobook narrators
British male comedy actors
British male film actors
British male radio actors
British male stage actors
British male television actors
British male voice actors
British people of Austrian descent
British people of German-Jewish descent
Deaths from dementia in England
Deaths from vascular dementia
German emigrants to England
German people of Austrian descent
Jewish emigrants from Nazi Germany to the United Kingdom
Male actors from Berlin
People educated at William Ellis School
People from Kilburn, London